Picture of You may refer to:

 Picture of You (album), a 2007 album by Ben Mills, or its title track
 "Picture of You" (Boyzone song), 1997
 "Picture of You", a song by Diesel on the 1992 album Hepfidelity
 "Picture of You", a song by My Morning Jacket on the 1999 album The Tennessee Fire
 "Picture of You", a song by Elwood
 "Picture of You", a song by Mr Hudson and The Library on the 2007 album A Tale of Two Cities

See also
 A Picture of You (disambiguation)
 Pictures of You (disambiguation)